GGSS may refer to:

 German General Social Survey, a national data generation program in Germany
 Gordon Graydon Memorial Secondary School, a high school in Brampton, Ontario, Canada
 Geetha Govinda Samskrita Sangha, an organization to promote Sanskrit all throughout the world.